Jens Lurås Oftebro (born 21 July 2000) is a Norwegian nordic combined skier.

Career
At the 2017 Junior World Championships he competed in three events, recording an individual 17th place and a team competition 6th place. At the 2018 Junior World Championships he took a 10th place in the 5 kilometres event and won a bronze medal in the relay.

He made his Continental Cup debut in January 2017 in Høydalsmo and recorded his first podium in January 2018 in Rena. He made his World Cup debut in March 2018 in Holmenkollen, at the same time finishing among the top 30 for the first time with a 27th place. On 29 November 2019 he reached his first World Cup podium, finishing third in Ruka. Exactly one year later, also in Ruka, he won his first World Cup race.

He represents the sports club IL Jardar. He is a younger brother of Einar Lurås Oftebro.

World Championship

References

External links
 
 

2000 births
Living people
Sportspeople from Bærum
Norwegian male Nordic combined skiers
FIS Nordic World Ski Championships medalists in Nordic combined
Nordic combined skiers at the 2022 Winter Olympics
Olympic Nordic combined skiers of Norway
Olympic gold medalists for Norway
Olympic silver medalists for Norway
Medalists at the 2022 Winter Olympics
Olympic medalists in Nordic combined
21st-century Norwegian people